Amitabh Bachchan Corporation Ltd.  is an Indian entertainment company which is owned by Amitabh Bachchan. It was founded in 1996, it did event-management, film production and distribution work. During 1999 it emerged as fiasco for Amitabh Bachchan. It was gone into bankruptcy and financial losses to owner. Miss World 1996 was organised by this organisation.

Controversies
The company specialized in film production and event management. The business was plagued by financial difficulties. The main reason for the bad performance of ABCL was blamed on the gross mismanagement of the company by the, then CEO, Sanjiv Gupta, who went on to become the CEO of Coca-Cola India.

The company burst into the limelight in 1996 when it was responsible for bringing to India the Miss World Pageant, but was then mired with controversy when the company was not able to pay its dues.

TV Show
Dekh Bhai Dekh a Hindi sitcom was directed by Anand Mahendru, produced by Jaya Bachchan (via ABCL) and starring Sushma Seth, Navin Nischol, Amar Upadhyay and Shekhar Suman in lead roles.

Filmography
Producer

Distributor

References

External links
 A.B.C.L. at imdb

Amitabh Bachchan
Hindi cinema
Film production companies based in Mumbai